Christofer Löfberg (born October 11, 1986 in Stockholm, Sweden) is a professional Swedish ice hockey player. He is a forward currently playing for IK Oskarshamn in HockeyAllsvenskan. Löfberg was drafted 80th overall by the Detroit Red Wings in the 2005 NHL Entry Draft.

Career statistics

External links 

1986 births
AIK IF players
Detroit Red Wings draft picks
Djurgårdens IF Hockey players
Huddinge IK players
Living people
Rögle BK players
Swedish ice hockey centres
Ice hockey people from Stockholm